Leisa Goddard is an Australian television journalist who has worked as a reporter/presenter for each of Australia's three commercial networks – Seven Network, Nine Network Australia, and Network Ten. She has covered major news events as a nightly news reporter and foreign correspondent. While with Network Ten, Goddard spent three years as the United States Bureau Chief based in Los Angeles and her work while embedded with Australian troops during the Afghanistan war gained a nomination for a Logie Award. She also founded Adoni Media, a media, PR and digital agency.

Early life 
Goddard grew up in Ipswich, Queensland, and completed Year 12 at Ipswich State High School. As a 16-year-old high school student, Goddard began her journalism career working as an intern at the local Ipswich newspaper, The Queensland Times. At 19, while in her second year of studying journalism at the University of Queensland, Goddard earned a cadetship at the Sunshine Coast Daily. In 1994, Goddard married and while married was publicly known as Leisa Goddard-Roles.

Career 
Goddard is best known for her years on prime-time Australian television news and current affairs programs. In 2003, she worked as Network Ten's United States bureau chief based in Los Angeles, covering global and U.S. news including disasters such as Hurricane Katrina as well as political milestones such as the second Presidential inauguration of George W. Bush, the Virginia Tech Shooting, a NASA shuttle launch, and daily political and business news. During her time in America, Goddard interviewed movie stars and covered the red carpet at multiple Academy Awards, Golden Globes, Screen Actors Guild Awards and the Grammys and had exclusives at world movie premieres.

In 2010, Goddard spent a month embedded (with her producer and cameraman) in the Afghanistan war zone. They came under Taliban rocket attack at an Australian base in the Oruzgan Province and continued to report. Network Ten and Goddard were nominated for a Logie Award in the category of Most Outstanding News Coverage at the 2011 ceremony in recognition of their work.

In 2012 she moved to current affairs and investigative reporting, when she re-joined the Seven Network first as a breakfast television and news reporter and then working on Today Tonight. In 2014, Goddard joined A Current Affair, the Nine Network's nightly current affairs program. She reported on-air, presenting investigative reports and national current affairs.

In 2012 Goddard founded media/PR and digital consultancy, Adoni Media. She also provides media training to CEOs, CFOS, politicians and company executives in Australia.

Awards 
Goddard received a United Nations Media Peace award in 2004. She was nominated for a Logie award for work as a war correspondent during the Afghanistan war in 2011.

Adoni Media's Your Health Your Choice campaign won the Judges Choice Award at the 18th Annual Complementary Medicines Australia in 2017, and was nominated for Best Government Relations Campaign award at Mumbrella CommsCon Awards in 2018.

References

External links 
 Official website

Year of birth missing (living people)
Living people
Australian television journalists